Pierre-Marie Théas (September 14, 1894 – April 3, 1977) was a French Roman Catholic Bishop of Montauban and Bishop of Tarbes and Lourdes. A significant figure in Catholic resistance to Nazism in France, he was recognised as Righteous among the Nations by Yad Vashem for his efforts to protect Jews from the Nazi Holocaust.

Biography
Pierre-Marie Théas was born on September 14, 1894 in Barzun, Pyrénées-Atlantiques. He was ordained as a priest on September 16, 1920 and was consecrated as the Bishop of Montauban on July 26, 1940.

In 1940 he was present at the last days of the former Spanish President Manuel Azaña, and offered support to his widow.

Resistance to Nazism
When the Archbishop of Toulouse, Jules-Géraud Saliège, led a powerful denunciation of the mistreatment of Jews in 1942, Théas joined other French bishops in denouncing the roundup of Jews for deportation to Nazi death camps. He wrote a pastoral letter condemning the Nazi deportation of Jews in the summer of 1942 in which he said: "I give voice to the outraged protest of Christian conscience and I proclaim… that all men, whatever their race or religion, have the right to be respected by individuals and by states." For his attempts to prevent the Jewish deportations and persecutions he was later honoured as "Righteous Among The Nations" by Yad Vashem.

The protest of the bishops is seen by various historians as a turning point in the formerly passive response of the Catholic Church in France. Marie-Rose Gineste transported a pastoral letter from Bishop Théas of Montauban by bicycle to forty parishes, denouncing the uprooting of men and women "treated as wild animals", and the French Resistance smuggled the text to London, where it was broadcast to France by the Radio Londres service of the BBC, reaching tens of thousands of homes.

Théas continued to oppose the Nazi policies culminating in a fiery sermon in his cathedral in 1944 in which he condemned the "Cruel and inhuman treatment of one of our fellow men". He was arrested the night after the sermon by the Gestapo. He was sent to a concentration camp where he spent ten weeks and then was released and returned to his parish.

Post-war

After the war, in March 1945, he became the first president of the movement for reconciliation and peace named Pax Christi. The group, initiated by Marthe Dortel Chaudot, aimed at first mainly at the reconciliation between France and Germany, but in 1952 it was recognized by Pope Pius XII as an official Catholic Peace Movement.

On February 17, 1947 he was appointed the Bishop of Tarbes and Lourdes by Pope Pius XII, and retired on February 12, 1970. On retirement he was appointed to the titular see of Sanctus Germanus, from which he resigned later in the same year.

He was noted for his belief in Liberation Theology. He has been credited as saying:

"Urged on by unrestrainable forces, today's world asks for a revolution. The revolution must succeed, but it can succeed only if the Church enters the fray, bringing the Gospel. After being liberated from Nazi dictatorship, we want to liberate the working class from capitalist slavery."

He died on April 3, 1977.

Works

 Ce Que Croyait Bernadette (The Faith of Bernadette)
 Ce Que Croyait Le Vierge Marie (The Faith of the Virgin Mary).
 Only Through These Hands translated into English by Geraldine Carrigan

References

External links
 Pierre-Marie Théas – his activity to save Jews' lives during the Holocaust, at Yad Vashem website

1894 births
1977 deaths
People from Béarn
Bishops of Montauban
Bishops of Tarbes
Participants in the Second Vatican Council
French Righteous Among the Nations
Catholic Righteous Among the Nations
French military personnel of World War I
Knights Commander of the Order of Merit of the Federal Republic of Germany
20th-century Roman Catholic bishops in France